The Catalog of Nearby Habitable Systems (HabCat) is a catalogue of star systems which conceivably have habitable planets. The list was developed by scientists Jill Tarter and Margaret Turnbull under the auspices of Project Phoenix, a part of SETI.

The list was based upon the Hipparcos Catalogue (which has 118,218 stars) by filtering on a wide range of star system features. The current list contains 17,129 "HabStars".

External links
Target Selection for SETI: 1. A Catalog of Nearby Habitable Stellar Systems, Turnbull, Tarter, submitted 31 Oct 2002 (last accessed 19 Jan 2010)
Target selection for SETI. II. Tycho-2 dwarfs, old open clusters, and the nearest 100 stars, by Turnbull and Tarter, (last accessed 19 Jan 2010)
HabStars - an article on the NASA website

Astronomical catalogues of stars
Search for extraterrestrial intelligence
Exoplanet catalogues